The term white savior is a critical description of a white person who is depicted as liberating, rescuing or uplifting non-white people; it is critical in the sense that it describes a  pattern in which people of color in economically under-developed nations that are majority non-white are denied agency and are seen as passive recipients of white benevolence. The role is considered a modern-day version of what is expressed in the poem The White Man's Burden (1899) by Rudyard Kipling. The term has been associated with Africa, and certain characters in film and television have been critiqued as white savior figures. Writer Teju Cole combined the term with "industrial complex" (derived from military–industrial complex and similarly applied elsewhere) to coin "White Savior Industrial Complex".

Usage 
The concept of the white savior originates from the poem "The White Man's Burden" (1899) by Rudyard Kipling. Its original usage was in the context of the Philippines, but the term has since become associated primarily with Africa, as well as with other regions of the world.

Association with Africa 
Africa has a history of slavery and of colonization. Damian Zane of BBC News said due to the history, Africans find the "white savior" attitude to help them "deeply patronising and offensive". Zane said, "Some argue that aid can be counter-productive, as it means African countries will continue to rely on outside help." Bhakti Shringarpure, writing for The Guardian, said, "Westerners trying to help poor, suffering countries have often been accused of having a 'white saviour complex': a term tied up in colonial history where Europeans descended to 'civilise' the African continent." The Washington Posts Karen Attiah said the white savior framework in Africa "follows the venerable tradition" of the novella Heart of Darkness (1899) by Joseph Conrad and that the tradition included the film Machine Gun Preacher (2011), the public relations campaign related to the documentary Kony 2012 (2012), and the writings of journalist Nicholas Kristof.

For example, actor and producer Louise Linton wrote a memoir about her gap year in Zambia, In Congo's Shadow, and wrote an article for The Telegraph, "How my dream gap year in Africa turned into a nightmare", to promote the book. Michael Schaub of Los Angeles Times said, "The reaction to Linton's article was swift and negative, accusing her of using clichés and misrepresentations... Several people have described Linton's memoir as a 'white savior' fantasy." Zambians and other Africans negatively criticized the article on social media. Attiah said the popular Instagram account "BarbieSavior" was inspired by the backlash to Linton's words. Special Broadcasting Service's Amal Awad said the Instagram account parodied "a reckless trend" of voluntourism (volunteering and touring) in which "'white saviours' use the less fortunate like props in their social media profiles". Awad said the interest in volunteering encouraged a business model that leverages a country's existing social issues and charges tourists for volunteering to be a "saviour".

Baaz, Gondola, Marijnen, and Verweijen, writing in Foreign Affairs, were critical of the "white savior complex" in the 2014 documentary Virunga, which features the Democratic Republic of the Congo's Virunga National Park and the conservation work of its park rangers. They said, "The movie features endless footage of a park guard hugging and playing with the gorillas, evoking the notion of the 'noble savage' who is close to nature, honest and naive, and dependent on the white man for his salvation. Rarely do we see the Congolese exercising political agency, even though there are numerous civil society activists in the region, often working at great personal risk."

For decades, the British charity Comic Relief sent white celebrities to African countries to have filmed their emotional reactions to impoverished conditions as part of asking the public for money. In 2020, they suspended the practice after criticism that it perpetuated white-savior stereotypes. One of the key critics was British Labour Party politician David Lammy, who in 2019  criticized the charity for "white savior" media in its African campaign. Reuters reported, "Lammy, who is of Guyanese descent, said online photos... evoked negative stereotypes about Africa and its reliance on Western white people for help." The charity and its presenter Stacey Dooley initially argued against the criticism. The Uganda-based campaign group No White Saviors said of the controversy, "There are levels to the white savior complex. You can mean well, do some good along the way and actively be perpetuating the (white savior complex)." NBC News said No White Saviors "tries to raise awareness about the negative impact many 'mainly white' aid workers have had on 'black and brown communities in the name of charity or mission work'".

Association with the Middle East 
The term has been used to refer to white Americans and Europeans that independently partake or assist in Middle Eastern wars. T. E. Lawrence, "Lawrence of Arabia", can be seen as the prototypical white savior figure. Similar accusations have been made against white European men that traveled to fight alongside pro-democracy rebels in the Syrian civil war. White feminists are sometimes seen as white saviors when supporting causes relating to the protection of Muslim women, especially as the implication of Muslim men as oppressors is seen as Islamophobic. Malala Yousafzai has been criticized as advancing white saviorism in Pakistan, due to her high approval in the West and her life being saved by white doctors.

In media

Appearance in film 

In film, the white savior is a cinematic trope in which a white character rescues people of color from their plight. The white savior is portrayed as messianic and often learns something about themselves in the process of rescuing. The trope reflects how media represents race relations by racializing concepts like morality as identifiable with white people over nonwhite people. White saviors are often male and are sometimes out of place in their own society until they lead minorities or foreigners. Screen Saviors: Hollywood Fictions of Whiteness labels the stories as fantasies that "are essentially grandiose, exhibitionistic, and narcissistic". Types of stories include white travels to "exotic" Asian locations, white defense against racism in the American South, or white protagonists having "racially diverse" helpers.

The white lead character is often delegated the role of racial leader in films, taking it upon themselves to save non-white minorities and immigrants from their struggles. The 2011 film The Help is about the mistreatment of Black Americans but offers only a white perspective. The movie, based on a book by a white author, was directed by a white person. The primary white character is portrayed as a heroine for empowering people of color, though often in minuscule ways. Similar criticisms can be made of popular films like Dangerous Minds, The Blind Side, and Remember the Titans.

Appearance in television 
Stephanie Greco Larson, writing in Media & Minorities: The Politics of Race in News and Entertainment, said Diff'rent Strokes (1978–1986) and Webster (1983–1987) were "shows in which white families adopt black children" and represented versions of "the white man's burden theme on television". Robin R. Means Coleman said, "In these comedies, Black children are rescued from their dysfunctional families or communities by Whites." In particular, Diff'rent Strokes featured the white millionaire character Philip Drummond. Film historian Donald Bogle said, "The millionaire Drummond becomes a great white father figure, able to provide the material comforts (as well as the subliminal emotional ones) and the cultural milieu that the Black community supposedly could never hope to match." Dustin Tahmahkera writes that Coleman labeled Drummond a "white savior" type who uses "his representational power to save the day by determining a conflict resolution that appeases all parties" including the indigenous representative Longwalker in the episode "Burial Ground". Tahmahkera also said a 1985 episode of Punky Brewster featured the girl protagonist telling a ghost story about her alter-ego Princess Moon helping "ancient Indians [who] suddenly appear... as cave dwellers who need a white savior... to defeat an evil spirit and help keep their Last of the Dogmen-like secret existence intact."

Larson said, "Inner-city schools have been the site of white man's burden dramas on television for decades" with TV series featuring white savior teachers. Larson identified the following series with such teachers: Room 222 (1969–1974), Welcome Back, Kotter (1975–1979), The White Shadow (1978–1981), and Boston Public (2000–2004). Larson said while Room 222 and Boston Public also had black teachers that "challenge the assumption that blacks are inherently inferior... these shows continue to avoid laying blame on social institutions for the status of blacks by showing the success of the individual black teachers."

Appearance in comic books 
The Marvel Comics character Iron Fist has been criticized as a white savior character. When the character was adapted in the TV series Iron Fist (2017–2018), The New York Times reported before the show premiered that the casting had received criticism for not changing the character to be Asian-American. The newspaper quoted arguments put forward by Keith Chow, editor-in-chief of The Nerds of Color pop culture blog, "If you’re going to have all these trappings of Orientalism on top of a white savior trope, why not upend both of those things by casting an Asian-American to play the role?" Iron Fist actor Finn Jones denied that Danny Rand would be a white savior figure and said that the series would address critics' concerns. In 2021, Marvel responded by having Rand retire the mantle and introducing a Chinese successor, Lin Lie.

"White Savior Industrial Complex"

Writer Teju Cole coined the term "White Savior Industrial Complex" following the release of the documentary Kony 2012 in March 2012, extrapolating the term in a seven-part response on Twitter. He later wrote an article for The Atlantic about the term.

Cole's response became a viral phenomenon, and The Guardians Bhakti Shringarpure reflected on the supportive Internet response to the Kony 2012 political campaign, "With the prevalence of campaigns, apps and games calling on us to help without really putting ourselves out, it seems that the white saviour idea is still alive and well – but now, the mode is digital." Heather Laine Talley, writing in Saving Face: Disfigurement and the Politics of Appearance, said of the response to Cole coining the term, "The very idea of the white savior industrial complex was met with both celebration and rage. Cole was alternately described as a truth teller and as a racist." Talley summarized Cole's response to his critics, "Ultimately, Cole implores Western (white) do-gooders to rethink doing good in two ways. First, own up to the motives that drive philanthropic interventions, so that personal catharsis does not subsume the real need of others. Second, consider the structural underpinnings and historical legacies that together sustain the very infrastructure of the problems that captivate our activist hearts."

Tim Engles, writing in Rhetorics of Whiteness: Postracial Hauntings in Popular Culture, Social Media, and Education, concurred with Cole's assessment, "The lack of real-world efficacy of their efforts, and the apparent unwillingness of most to go any further than such limited and self-aggrandizing steps, suggests that mere validation of white racial privilege was indeed the most significant outcome."

In essence, Cole's concept of the "White Savior Industrial Complex" refers explicitly to the damaging effects of white saviors who prioritize a "big emotional experience" achieved through minor acts of charity or activism over tackling larger issues like systematic oppression and corruption that plague many nations around the world – notably, issues that are often directly caused or perpetuated by the United States.

See also 

 
 
 
 
 
 
 
 
 No White Saviors - campaign

References

Further reading

External links

Sociology of culture
Race (human categorization)
Inequality
Racism